Clone Hero is a freeware music rhythm video game created by Ryan Foster, first released in alpha on March 1, 2017, receiving a full release on November 29, 2022. The game is a clone of the Guitar Hero franchise with nearly identical gameplay. The main draw of the game is its ability to play community-made songs, which has resulted in a large fan community around the game as well as a resurgence in popularity for the genre.

Gameplay 

Clone Hero, by design, features nearly identical gameplay to Guitar Hero, and uses GUI assets from Guitar Hero games. Gameplay involves hitting colored in time to songs; Clone Hero allows players to use any PC-compatible controller from the Guitar Hero or Rock Band franchises, as well as a keyboard or any other input device. Unlike the Guitar Hero series, by default there is no penalty for missing notes, aside from breaking a combo, making it impossible to fail a song, although there is an option to enable this.

For guitar, players must hold specific buttons that line up with combinations of five colored notes that appear on the screen on a "highway"; when the notes hit the bottom of the highway, the player must strum to hit the notes in time with the music. Notes can be singular, or multiple at a time, forming a chord. Notes can also be sustains, in which the player must hold the matching button(s) after strumming, the duration of the hold being indicated by a line following the note or chord. There is also an "open strum" note, represented with a purple bar, which requires the player to strum without pressing any other buttons. In addition to normal notes, there are "HOPO"s ("hammer-ons" and "pull-offs") and "tap notes", which both do not require the player to strum them to hit them, with the difference between the two being that a string of HOPOs must begin with a strum, and the player must re-strum if they miss a note. Certain notes may also be part of a "star power phrase", marked by a series of notes with star outlines. Successfully playing the marked section will reward the player with star power, which can be used to double the combo multiplier for a limited time. The game also contains a mode which emulates the guitar gameplay of Guitar Hero Live, which is notably different from other games in the series, involving six guitar buttons instead of the standard five.

For drums, gameplay is similar, involving one less possible note; players must hit a corresponding drum or cymbal when a note hits the bottom of the highway. There is also a bass drum note, represented by an orange bar, which unlike the guitar's open strum can be combined with other notes.

Unlike Guitar Hero games which each have a large built-in setlist, Clone Hero comes pre-bundled with only seventeen songs as of the v1.0 update, including "Troopers of the Stars" by DragonForce, a composition made by the band specifically for Clone Hero. The game instead largely relies on the ability to play community-made songs, called "charts". However, unlike games in the Guitar Hero series, these songs do not need to be original compositions, and can instead be any audio file a member of the community wishes to turn into a playable chart. This allows for any song to be made playable in the game, but also leads to many humorous and/or non-musical audio files being turned into charts, as well as the creation of many intentionally impossible charts. The freedom offered by the game's system has also spawned many charts that are created as brutal challenges to other players, far beyond the difficulty of anything in the standard Guitar Hero series. While Clone Hero includes the main four difficulty modes seen in Guitar Hero, the vast majority of charts are designed for Expert mode.

Development 
Clone Hero started as a small project of Ryan Foster's in 2011, then called GuitaRPG, built in the XNA engine and bearing simple, 2D graphics. Around 2015, the game's name was changed to Guitar Game to reflect its forking away from the RPG style, and had been upgraded with pseudo-3D graphics made with 2D graphics with warped perspective. The project was later moved to Unity, and received its final name change to Clone Hero. In 2017, the game had its first alpha release.

Reception 
Clone Hero made an appearance at Awesome Games Done Quick 2020. The game has been praised for its large and thriving community, as well as its gameplay which has been favorably compared to the original Guitar Hero games.

References

External links 

 

Indie video games
Guitar video games
Music video games
Video games based on musicians
MacOS games
Windows games
Linux games
Video game clones
2017 video games
Drumming video games
Multiplayer and single-player video games
Cooperative video games